Monstereophonic (Theaterror vs. Demonarchy) is the eighth studio album by the Finnish rock band Lordi, released on 16 September 2016. While Theaterror, the first half of the album, includes songs in the style that the band is generally known for, the second half of the album, Demonarchy, is conceptual and includes six or more minute songs. The band announced that the members' new costumes will be split in half, representing two sides of the album.

Track listing

Personnel 

Lordi
 Mr Lordi – vocals, artwork, layout, guitars (tracks 9–14)
 Amen – guitars (tracks 2–7)
 OX – bass
 Mana – drums, backing vocals, engineering
 Hella – keyboards

Additional musicians
 Nalle – keyboards (additional)
 Ralph Ruiz – narration (track 1)
 Peter Lerche – lead guitars (track 14)
 Jonas Olsson – stomp march (track 3)
 Tuomo Saikkonen – vocals (track 6)

Backing vocals
 Netta Dahlberg
 Katri Metso
 Tracy Lipp
 Jarkko Ahola
 Jessica Love
 Dylan Broda

Production
 Nino Laurenne – production, engineering, mixing
 Svante Forsbäck – mastering
 Mikko Röhman – engineering
 Miiro Varjus – engineering
 Eero Kokko – photography

Charts

References 

2016 albums
Lordi albums
AFM Records albums